'Kumato' is a trade name given to a patented cultivar of tomato developed in Spain called 'Olmeca', which went by experimental number SX 387.  'Kumato' is a standard-size tomato cultivar weighing between 80 and 120 grams (2.8 and 4.2 ounces).  It is firm, with a color ranging from a green to reddish brown or purple, varying in flavor from almost no flavor to sweeter than typical tomatoes due to a higher fructose content. As the 'Kumato' is a hybrid, planted seeds will not necessarily grow plants identical to the parent.

'Kumato' is grown by specially selected growers in Australia, Belgium, Canada, France, Greece, the Netherlands, Spain, Switzerland, Turkey, Mexico, Southern Lebanon, and on the Isle of Wight in the United Kingdom. Unlike the seeds of other tomato cultivars, 'Kumato' seeds cannot be purchased by the general public. The patent holder, the Swiss agribusiness Syngenta, has stated that it will never make 'Kumato' seeds available to the general public as the 'Kumato' tomato is grown as what is known as a "club variety," whereby Syngenta sells seeds only to licensed growers that go through a rigorous selection process, and participation is by invitation only. Syngenta maintains ownership of the cultivar throughout the entire value chain from breeding to marketing; selected growers must agree to follow specified cultivation protocols and pay fees for licenses per acre of greenhouse, costs of the seeds, and royalties based on the volume of tomatoes produced. Typically, Syngenta licenses only one large vertically integrated greenhouse winter producer per country that has well established relationships with grocery chains.

See also

 List of tomato cultivars

References 

Tomato cultivars